Roush is a surname. Notable people with the surname include:

Politics
Glenn Roush (1934–2020), American politician in Montana
J. Edward Roush (1920–2004), United States Representative for Indiana, namesake of:
 J. Edward Roush Lake, a reservoir in Huntington, Indiana
 J.E. Roush Fish and Wildlife Area, in Huntington, Indiana

Science
Chris Roush (born 1964), American economist
Eva Myrtelle Roush (1886–1954), American botanist
William R. Roush (born 1952), American chemist

Sports
Edd Roush (1893–1988), American baseball player
Jack Roush (born 1942), American auto racing entrepreneur, owner of:
Roush Fenway Racing, a NASCAR team
Roush Performance, an automotive company
John Roush (American football) (born 1953), American college football player at Oklahoma

Other
Gerald Roush (1941–2010), American sports car expert
J. Levi Roush (1838–1906), American soldier and Medal of Honor recipient
Jane Marum Roush (born 1956), American lawyer and judge
Jerry Roush (born 1986), American musician
John A. Roush, American academic administrator
Patricia Roush, American activist against international child abduction
Sherrilyn Roush, American philosopher

See also
Reusch (disambiguation)
Ruche (disambiguation)
Rausch (disambiguation)